This article is about the particular significance of the year 1780 to Wales and its people.

Incumbents
Lord Lieutenant of Anglesey - Sir Nicholas Bayly, 2nd Baronet
Lord Lieutenant of Brecknockshire and Monmouthshire – Charles Morgan of Dderw
Lord Lieutenant of Caernarvonshire - Thomas Wynn
Lord Lieutenant of Cardiganshire – Wilmot Vaughan, 1st Earl of Lisburne
Lord Lieutenant of Carmarthenshire – Thomas Johnes (until 28 April); John Vaughan (from 28 April
Lord Lieutenant of Denbighshire - Richard Myddelton  
Lord Lieutenant of Flintshire - Sir Roger Mostyn, 5th Baronet 
Lord Lieutenant of Glamorgan – John Stuart, Lord Mountstuart
Lord Lieutenant of Merionethshire - Sir Watkin Williams-Wynn, 4th Baronet
Lord Lieutenant of Montgomeryshire – George Herbert, 2nd Earl of Powis
Lord Lieutenant of Pembrokeshire – Sir Hugh Owen, 5th Baronet
Lord Lieutenant of Radnorshire – Edward Harley, 4th Earl of Oxford and Earl Mortimer

Bishop of Bangor – John Moore
Bishop of Llandaff – Shute Barrington
Bishop of St Asaph – Jonathan Shipley
Bishop of St Davids – John Warren

Events
January - Admiral Sir Thomas Foley plays an important role in the relief of Gibraltar.
1 July - Anthony Bacon acquires the lease of the Hirwaun ironworks.
26 August - Edward Williames Salusbury Vaughan succeeds to the Rûg estate.
29 September - Sir Watkin Lewes is elected Lord Mayor of London.
unknown dates
Thomas Parry Jones-Parry marries his cousin Margaret and acquires the Madryn estate.
The Ladies of Llangollen settle at Plas Newydd.
Richard Price devises the "Northampton Tables" for calculating actuarial valuation for assurance and pensions.
The development of Ebbw Vale Steelworks begins.

Arts and literature

New books
John Walters - Poems with Notes

Music
Henry Mills of Llanidloes impresses Thomas Charles so much with his singing that he is appointed to supervise the improvement of congregational singing in the district.

Births
10 February - James Henry Cotton, Dean of Bangor (died 1862)
15 April - Angharad Llwyd, antiquary (died 1866)
14 May - Sir Thomas Frankland Lewis, politician (died 1855)
7 October - Wyndham Lewis, MP (died 1838)
date unknown 
Dic Aberdaron (Richard Robert Jones), traveller and linguist (died 1843) 
Thomas Prothero, lawyer and businessman (died 1853)

Deaths
6 March - Sir John Meredith, lawyer, 65
1 April - Sir Stephen Glynne, 7th Baronet, 35 (ruptured blood-vessel)
May - Thomas Johnes, Lord Lieutenant of Carmarthenshire, about 59
date unknown 
Howell Gwynne, former MP and Lord Lieutenant of Radnorshire, 61/62
Richard Thomas, genealogist, 46

References

Wales
Wales